Grzymała or Grzymala is a Polish surname. Notable people with the surname include: 

 Adam Grzymała-Siedlecki (1876–1967), Polish writer
 Andrzej Grzymała (died 1466), Polish academic
 Anna Grzymala (born 1970), American political scientist
 Domarat Grzymała (died 1324), Polish bishop
 Edward Grzymała (1906–1942), Polish Roman Catholic priest
 Wojciech Grzymała (1793–1871), Polish soldier and politician

See also
 

Polish-language surnames